The Department of Geography is one of the constituent departments of the University of Cambridge and is located on the Downing Site. The department has long had an international reputation as a leading centre of research and is consistently ranked as one of the best geography departments in the UK. In 2022 the department was ranked by The Guardian University Rankings as the best geography undergraduate degree in the country.

History

There is a long tradition of geography at Cambridge stretching back to the first University Lecturer in Geography appointed in 1888. Teaching was initially for a special examination leading to a diploma in geography. The Geographical Tripos - the examination for a B.A. degree - was established in 1919. In 1931 the first professor was appointed and in 1933 the department moved into its own accommodation. That building, which now constitutes the eastern end of the department, was considerably extended in the 1930s, with the construction of new lecture theatres and laboratories. In the 1980s, the building was further extended with the addition of a top floor to provide a new laboratory for computing, remote sensing and geographical information systems. In 1999 the department expanded again, to occupy two floors in an adjacent building where new laboratories, seminar rooms and offices are housed.

Since then, the Cambridge Group for the History of Population and Social Structure (CAMPOP) has been integrated into the teaching and research activities of the Department (2001), and the Scott Polar Research Institute became a sub-department in 2002. Today, the Department has 35 academic staff including ten professors and four readers.

Research

Research in the department is organised in the following thematic research groups:
 Vital Geographies
 Infrastructural Geographies
 Geographies of Knowledge
 Biogeography and Biogeomorphology
 Climate and Environmental Dynamics
 Glaciology and Glacial Geology

Notable alumni and staff

The department has produced a large range of notable alumni, including David Harvey, the world's most cited academic geographer, and winner of the Lauréat Prix International de Géographie Vautrin Lud.
Other notable alumni and staff include:

 Dawn Airey
 Ash Amin
 John Barrett
 Anthony Bebbington
 Piers Blaikie
 William Maurice Brown
 Paul Brummell
 Sylvia Chant
 Richard Chorley
 Miles Clark
 Roger Clarke
 Mark Cleary
 John Terence Coppock
 Bernie Cotton
 Philip Cox
 Mike Crang
 Gabriel Crouch
 Frank Debenham
 Hugh Dennis
 Robin Donkin
 Julian A. Dowdeswell
George Freeman
 Phil Gibbard
 Andrew Goudie
 Derek Gregory
 Peter Haggett
 Peter Hall
 John Heap
 Michael Heffernan
 Bronwyn Hill
 Mike Kirkby
 Hal Lister
 Sylvia Law
 Huw Lewis-Jones
 Paul Madden 
 Gordon Manley
 Ron Martin
 Ann Mather
 Michael Mortimore
 John Noble
 James Oldfield
 Joe Painter
 Chris Philo
 Luke Piper
 Matthew Price
 Sarah A. Radcliffe
 Phil Rees
 Chris Robinson
 John Rymill
 Susan J. Smith
 Oskar Spate
 Ken Sykora
 Sam Toy
 Piers Vitebsky
 Andrew Warren
 George T. Whitesides
 David Wilshire
 Charles W. J. Withers
 James Wordie
 Tony Wrigley

References

External links
Official department website

 
Geography, Department of
Geography departments in the United Kingdom